Eunice Nicholson Askov is an American literary scholar, currently a Distinguished Professor Emerita of Education at Pennsylvania State University.

References 

Pennsylvania State University faculty
Living people
Year of birth missing (living people)
Place of birth missing (living people)